Afterglow is the third box set compilation by Electric Light Orchestra (ELO). It was released in 1990 with liner notes by music critic and editor Ira Robbins of Trouser Press. A different two-CD compilation with identical artwork was issued simultaneously under the title The Very Best of The Electric Light Orchestra.

Overview: Afterglow 
The box set mixes the usual hit singles with lesser known album tracks and non-album B-sides, and is most notable for including most of the Secret Messages (1983) tracks that were not released when the intended album was reduced from a double to a single LP as well as B-sides from Balance of Power (1986) singles.

The discs of the box set were labelled with letters "E", "L" and "O", each covering a different compilation set of albums:
 Disc "E" – The Electric Light Orchestra (1971; tracks 1–2), ELO 2 (1973; tracks 3–6), On the Third Day (1973; tracks 7–9) and Eldorado (1974; tracks 10–11) (with the exception of "One Summer Dream" from Face the Music (1975))
 Disc "L" – Face the Music (tracks 1, 3, 5–6), A New World Record (1976; tracks 2, 4, 7–10), Out of the Blue (1977; tracks 11–15) and Discovery (1979; tracks 16–17)
 Disc "O" – Time (1981; tracks 1–3, 6 & 9), Secret Messages (1983; tracks 10 & 18) and Balance of Power (1986; tracks 13 & 16) (with the exception of "Shine a Little Love" from Discovery)

The songs from soundtrack album Xanadu (1980) were not included.

The song "Destination Unknown", which was previously released as a B-side to "Calling America" single, was issued as promo only CD single.

Track listing: Afterglow
All tracks written by Jeff Lynne, except "Roll Over Beethoven" by Chuck Berry and Ludwig van Beethoven.

Disc E (Disc 1)
"10538 Overture" – 5:32
"Mr. Radio" – 5:04
"Kuiama" – 11:19
"In Old England Town (Boogie No. 2)"  – 6:54
"Mama" – 7:03
"Roll Over Beethoven" – 8:08
"Bluebird Is Dead" – 4:24
"Ma-Ma-Ma Belle" – 3:52
"Showdown" – 4:07
"Can't Get It Out of My Head" – 4:25
"Boy Blue" – 5:20
"One Summer Dream"  – 5:47

Disc L (Disc 2)
"Evil Woman" – 4:18
"Tightrope"  – 5:03
"Strange Magic"  – 4:29
"Do Ya" – 3:44
"Nightrider"  – 4:22
"Waterfall" – 4:10
"Rockaria!" – 3:14
"Telephone Line"  – 4:39
"So Fine" – 3:54
"Livin' Thing"  – 3:31
"Mr. Blue Sky" (Japanese 7" edit) – 3:44
"Sweet Is the Night" – 3:27
"Turn to Stone" – 3:48
"Sweet Talkin' Woman" – 3:48
"Steppin' Out" – 4:38
"Midnight Blue"  – 4:17
"Don't Bring Me Down" – 4:03

Disc O (Disc 3)
"Prologue" – 1:16
"Twilight" – 3:33
"Julie Don't Live Here"  – 3:40 
B-side to the "Twilight" single, 1981
"Shine a Little Love" – 4:39
"When Time Stood Still" – 3:33 
B-side to the "Hold on Tight" single, 1981
"Rain Is Falling" – 3:57
"The Bouncer" – 3:13 
B-side to the "Four Little Diamonds" single, 1983; Previously unreleased in the US
"Hello My Old Friend" – 7:51 
Previously unreleased
"Hold on Tight"  – 3:06
"Four Little Diamonds" – 4:08 
features a slightly longer intro than the album version
"Mandalay"  – 5:19 
Previously unreleased
"Buildings Have Eyes"  – 3:55 
B-side to "Secret Messages" single; Previously unreleased in the US
"So Serious"  – 2:39
"A Matter of Fact"  – 3:58 
B-side to "So Serious" single; Previously unreleased in the US
"No Way Out" – 3:23 
Previously unreleased
"Getting to the Point"  – 4:28
"Destination Unknown"  – 4:05 
B-side to "Calling America" 12 inch UK single; Previously unreleased in the US
"Rock 'n' Roll Is King" (Single edit) – 3:07

Track listing: The Very Best Of The Electric Light Orchestra
All tracks written by Jeff Lynne, except "Roll Over Beethoven" by Chuck Berry.

Disc 1
"Evil Woman" – 4:18
"Livin' Thing" – 3:31
"Turn to Stone" – 3:48
"Can't Get It Out of My Head"  – 4:25
"Rockaria!"  – 3:14
"Telephone Line"  – 4:39
"Mr. Blue Sky" Japanese 7' Edit  – 3:44
"Sweet Talkin' Woman"  – 3:48
"Confusion"  – 3:42
"Rock 'n' Roll Is King" (Album version)  – 3:43
"Strange Magic"  – 4:05
"Calling America"  – 4:05

Disc 2
"Don't Bring Me Down" – 4:03
"So Serious" – 2:41
"Getting to the Point"  – 4:28
"Do Ya"  – 3:45
"Hold on Tight"  – 3:06
"Secret Messages" (Album version)  – 4:47
"Wild West Hero" – 4:40
"Here Is the News" – 3:49
"Shine a Little Love"  – 4:40
"I'm Alive"  – 3:45
"All Over the World" – 4:01
"Roll Over Beethoven" (Single edit) – 4:32

Personnel
 Jeff Lynne – vocals, guitars
 Bev Bevan – drums, percussion
 Richard Tandy – keyboards, guitar
 Kelly Groucutt – bass, vocals (1974 onwards)
 Mike de Albuquerque – bass (to 1974)
 Bill Hunt – French horn, hunting horn (tracks 1 & 2 on Disc E)
 Mik Kaminski – violin
 Wilfred Gibson – violin (tracks 3, 4, 5, 6, 8 & 9 on Disc E)
 Steve Woolam – violin (tracks 1 & 2 on Disc E)
 Mike Edwards – cello (to 1974)
 Melvyn Gale – cello (1975 onwards)
 Hugh McDowell – cello
 Colin Walker – cello (tracks 3, 4, 5 & 6 on Disc E)
 Marc Bolan – guitar (on "Ma-Ma-Ma Belle")
 Roy Wood – vocals, guitars, cello, bass, wind instruments (tracks 1, 2 & 4 on Disc E)
 Ira Robbins (Trouser Press) – liner notes (1990)

See also
 Flashback

References

Albums produced by Jeff Lynne
Electric Light Orchestra compilation albums
1990 compilation albums
Epic Records compilation albums